Ethel Remey (February 22, 1895 - February 28, 1979 ) was an American actress. She was sometimes credited as Ethel Everett.

Her most famous role was her portrayal of Alma Miller, mother of Lisa Miller (Eileen Fulton) on the soap opera As the World Turns. She played the role from 1963 to 1977.

References

External links

American soap opera actresses
1895 births
1979 deaths
20th-century American actresses